Johannes Cuvelier (fl c. 1372–d. after 1387) was a composer of the Ars subtilior, whose surviving works are preserved in the Chantilly Codex. He was possibly born in Tournai and worked at the court of Charles V.

His most important work is the poem  La Chanson de Bertrand du Guesclin, a tribute to the Breton military commander Bertrand du Guesclin.

References

Ars subtilior composers
14th-century births
Year of death unknown
French classical composers
Musicians from Tournai
14th-century French composers